Bhajarang Engineering College is an Engineering College that is located in Ayathur, Thiruvallur (Near Veppampattu railway station). This college is affiliated to Anna University, Chennai. Bhajarang Engineering College established during 2001 – 2002 has been approved by the All India council for Technical Education, New Delhi and affiliated to Anna University, Chennai.

BEC is established under BHAJARANG EDUCATIONAL & SOCIAL TRUST, founded by Mr.M.G.Baskaran, as its Chairman and Managing Trustee.

Bhajarang Educational & Social Trust, a Telugu Linguistic Minority Trust having its registered office at No. 14,3 rd Main Road, Krishnapuram, Thiruninravur, Thiruvallur District – 602 024, was started to establish Engineering Colleges, Arts Colleges, Medical Colleges and other institutions for the sole benefit of the Telugu Linguistic Minority people. Meritorious students of other communities and religions are also admitted subject to the rules of the Government of Tamil Nadu.

Course Offered (Departments) 
 B.Tech / Information Technology.
 B.E / Computer Science Engineering.
 B.E / Electronic Communication Engineering.
 B.E / Electric and Electronic Engineering.
 B.E / Mechanical Engineering...
 B.E / Civil Engineering...

Eligibility for Admission 
Candidates should have passed in the H.S.C Examination of the State Board of Tamil Nadu or any other equivalent examination..

Facilities offered

Transport 
More than 20 college buses help the students & staff to commute to the college from various places especially all city areas.

Hostel 
There are separate hostels for Boys and Girls in the campus. Boy's hostel is situated inside the college campus in an area of 5,000 sq.ft of land The Boys Hostel accommodates 300 boy's. There are around 100 students in the boy's hostel.

Library 
The Bhajarang Engineering College Library established in the year 2001 July was housed in a class room with 1500 books to start with.

References 
 Bhajarang Engineering College Official Website
 Bhajarang Engineering College Listed in Affiliated college list of Anna University, Chennai. (PDF)
 Bhajarang Engineering College, Thiruvallur

External links
 

Engineering colleges in Chennai